Exposé (also known as House on Straw Hill and Trauma) is a British 1976 psychological thriller that was referred to as a video nasty during the 1980s. It is a low-budget example of the 1970s exploitation film, having significant amounts of sexual and violent content. The film was partly financed by Paul Raymond and starred Udo Kier, Linda Hayden and 1970s sex symbol Fiona Richmond. It was originally released straight to theaters in March 1976 and it received a heavy amount of cuts due to its graphic violent and sexual content. On its original cinematic release over three minutes were cut to allow it an X certificate. An uncut video version was banned in the UK following the passing of the Video Recordings Act 1984. Both the 1997 UK video and subsequent DVD re-releases contain significant edits.

Plot 
Paul Martin (Kier) is a novelist who rents out a secluded cottage in the British countryside in order to complete his new book, a pretentious sex romp. Plagued by recurring paranoid nightmares, he has split with his girlfriend Suzanne (Richmond) and is having problems writing his book. Paul employs a secretary, Linda Hindstatt (Hayden), to type the manuscript for him. Paul meets Linda at the railway station, where Linda is intimidated by a couple of youths, prompting Paul to give them a battering. After settling into the house, Linda takes a walk in a field where she is raped by the men but soon gets revenge when she shoots them both with a shotgun. Meanwhile, Paul keeps having nightmares and all his advances on Linda are rejected. Linda insinuates herself into the household, displacing the housekeeper, Mrs. Aston. When a suspicious Mrs. Aston returns to the house at night, she is murdered: her throat slashed with a knife. As Paul and Linda work on completing the novel, he asks Suzanne to come back only to have Linda seduce her. As Linda and Suzanne have sex, Paul then crashes his car into a river, the brakes having been tampered with (assumed) by Linda. Suzanne is murdered in the shower by Linda and everything erupts into a pandemonium of violence.

Cast 
 Udo Kier as Paul Martin
 Linda Hayden as Linda Hindstatt
 Fiona Richmond as Suzanne
 Patsy Smart as Mrs. Aston
 Karl Howman as Big Youth
 Vic Armstrong as Small Youth

Production 
The house being used for the film was, at the time, being rented by the director, James Kenelm Clarke. The house is situated on Spring Elms Lane, Little Baddow,
Essex and is a private residence. The rape scene and the final scene were filmed in the wheatfield adjoining the back garden. Other locations used around Little Baddow were Mowden Hall Lane and its junction with North Hill, the bridge on Church Road as it crosses the River Chelmer, and the ford in Hurrells Lane. The station scenes were filmed at Hatfield Peverel Railway Station

In a documentary on the DVD of The Blood on Satan's Claw Hayden says that this is the only movie she regrets making and was not the film she had made originally.

Kier revealed his own antipathy for the film in a 2014 interview with Empire, bemoaning the fact that his voice was dubbed and that he was never paid. He also dismissed Richmond as a credible actress, saying "The other girl, Linda Hayden, she was a real actress. Fiona Richmond was just a famous person trying to be naked in a movie."

Edits 
 Udo Kier was dubbed.
The current 18-rated UK DVD version has around 51 secs of cuts, with edits to the rape scene, some of Suzanne's death, and the shot of her dead in the shower.
In 2013, Severin Films released a Blu-ray and DVD double-disc set of Exposé under the title, House on Straw Hill. In the preamble on the disc, Severin state that this version was created using the original negative and two prints of the film to give it its uncut form. The quoted running time is 84 minutes.

Remake 
The film was re-made in 2010 as Stalker (aka Exposé), directed by Martin Kemp, starring Anna Brecon as writer Paula Martin and Jane March as Linda, and with original star Linda Hayden as "Mrs Brown".

References

External links 
 
 Severin Films

1976 films
1976 horror films
1970s slasher films
British slasher films
Censored films
Films directed by James Kenelm Clarke
1970s English-language films
1970s British films